Multan District , is a district in the province of Punjab, Pakistan.  Its capital is the city of Multan. The district has a population of  million (as of 2017) and an area of 3,720 square kilometres. The district consists of tehsils of Multan saddar, Multan city, Jalalpur Pirwala and Shujabad.

Vehari, Khanewal and Lodhran were Tehsils of Multan district. Vehari was made separate district in 1976. Khanewal was cut off from Multan and made a separate district in 1985. Lodhran was split off as a separate district from Multan in 1991.

Location
Multan District is surrounded by the Khanewal to the North and North East, the Vehari to the East and Lodhran to the South. The Chenab River passes on its Western side, across which lies Muzaffargarh.

Demographics 
At the time of the 2017 census the district had a population of 4,746,166, of which 2,435,195 were males and 2,310,408 females. Rural population is 2,687,246 while the urban population is 2,058,920. The literacy rate was 60.21%.

Religion 
As per the 2017 census, Muslims were the predominant religious community with 99.37% of the population while Christians were 0.54% of the population.

Language 
At the time of the 2017 census, 64.41% of the population spoke Saraiki, 17.77% Punjabi and 16.20% Urdu as their first language.

Tehsils

 Jalalpur Pirwala
 Multan City
 Multan Saddar
 Shujabad

References

External links 
 Multan City
 Hamara Multan
 Multan District

 
Districts of Punjab, Pakistan